Glenea extrema is a species of beetle in the family Cerambycidae. It was described by David Sharp in 1900.

References

extrema
Beetles described in 1900